Anuj Desai (born 4 February 1951) is a Kenyan sports shooter. He competed in the men's 50 metre rifle prone event at the 1996 Summer Olympics.

References

External links
 

1951 births
Living people
Kenyan male sport shooters
Olympic shooters of Kenya
Shooters at the 1996 Summer Olympics
Place of birth missing (living people)
20th-century Kenyan people